In one of the most notable seasons in the club's history, West Ham United won the Second Division in the 1980–81 season to return to the top flight of English football after an absence of three years.

Season summary
West Ham lost just four League matches all season, were unbeaten in the League after Boxing Day, and finished 13 points clear of second-placed Notts County, accumulating a record points total for the Second Division.

The Hammers also reached the League Cup final for the second time, after a run in which they knocked out First Division Tottenham Hotspur and Coventry City. In the final, they forced a replay against Liverpool after Ray Stewart scored an equalising penalty in the last minute of extra-time, but lost 2–1 at Villa Park.

West Ham failed to retain the FA Cup, which they had won the previous season, when they lost to Wrexham in a second replay in the third round. However, they reached the quarter-finals of the European Cup Winners' Cup in a run that included a 5–1 victory over Real Madrid's reserve side Castilla played behind closed doors because of crowd trouble. They were eliminated 4–2 on aggregate by the eventual winners, Dinamo Tbilisi.

League table

Results
West Ham United's score comes first

Football League Second Division

FA Cup

League Cup

European Cup Winners' Cup

Charity Shield

Squad

See also
West Ham United F.C. by season

References

1980-81
English football clubs 1980–81 season
1980 sports events  in London
1981 sports events  in London